Yagodina Knoll (‘Yagodinska Mogila’ \'ya-go-din-ska mo-'gi-la\) is the ice-covered hill rising to 595 m at the northeast extremity of Trinity Peninsula in Graham Land, Antarctica.  It is surmounting Mott Snowfield to the southwest.

Location
German-British mapping in 1996.

Maps
 Trinity Peninsula. Scale 1:250000 topographic map No. 5697. Institut für Angewandte Geodäsie and British Antarctic Survey, 1996.
 Antarctic Digital Database (ADD). Scale 1:250000 topographic map of Antarctica. Scientific Committee on Antarctic Research (SCAR), 1993–2016.

Notes

References
 Yagodina Knoll. SCAR Composite Antarctic Gazetteer
 Bulgarian Antarctic Gazetteer. Antarctic Place-names Commission. (details in Bulgarian, basic data in English)

External links
 Yagodina Knoll. Copernix satellite image

Hills of Trinity Peninsula
Bulgaria and the Antarctic